The Türkmenbaşy Gulf or Türkmenbaşy Aýlagy or Türkmenbaşy Bay is a bay of the Caspian Sea in the coast of Turkmenistan.

With the Türkmenbaşy Peninsula to the north and the Cheleken Peninsula to the south, the gulf extends westwards into the sea for 46 km and has an 18 km wide mouth. At its northwest corner are the Bala-Ishem salt marshes which mark the mouth of the dried-up Uzboy River. It became part of the Hazar Nature Reserve in 1968 and was designated as a Ramsar site in 2008. Among the animals in the bay the Krasnovodsk herring (Alosa braschnikowi nirchi) and the Caspian seal deserve mention.

Cartography
In 18th century maps of the Caspian Sea the gulf was known as 'Balkan Gulf' or 'Balchan Gulf' and was assumed to be much deeper. It was first accurately cartographed by Fedor Ivanovich Soimonov during the 1719 Caspian Expedition which surveyed the Caspian Sea from 1719 to 1727.

The bay was later known as 'Krasnovodsk Gulf' or 'Krasnovodsk Bay', but it changed its name when the city at its shores changed its name from Krasnovodsk to Türkmenbaşy.

See also
Türkmenbaşy

References

External links
Caspian Sea Biodiversity
Overview of oil and natural gas in the Caspian Sea region Last Updated: August 26, 2013

Bodies of water of Turkmenistan
Bays of the Caspian Sea
Ramsar sites in Turkmenistan